De Lassus is an unincorporated community in St. Francois County, in the U.S. state of Missouri. Much of the community has been annexed by Farmington.

History
De Lassus was platted in 1869 when the railroad was extended to that point. A post office called Delassus was established in 1870, and remained in operation until 1915. The community has the name of Charles de Hault de Lassus, a Spanish colonial official.

De Lassus can be found in the 1876 edition of The Monitor Guide to Post Offices and Railroad Stations in the United States and Canada, page 61.

References

Unincorporated communities in St. Francois  County, Missouri
Unincorporated communities in Missouri